OY Carinae (abbreviated OY Car) is an eclipsing binary system approximately 277 light-years away from the Sun, classed as a cataclysmic variable. The system comprises an eclipsing white dwarf and red dwarf that orbit each other every 1.51 hours, and possibly a yet unconfirmed third low-mass (substellar?) companion.

Planetary system?

Greenhill et al. (2009) would invoke the presence of a third object to explain orbital period variations with an apparent periodicity of roughly 35 years. The third body could yield a minimum mass 7 times greater than Jupiter and be located 9.5 astronomical units away from the cataclysmic variable system, being likely either a massive planetary object or else a very low-mass brown dwarf.
It is likely that the apparent change is due to solar cycle type magnetic activity in the secondary star. Large irregular deviations from the general trend, with time-scales of years, also occur. Further observations will be able to confirm or disprove the presence of a substellar companion.

See also 
 Algol
 CM Draconis
 HW Virginis
 NN Serpentis
 QS Virginis

References 

Carina (constellation)
Eclipsing binaries
Hypothetical planetary systems
Carinae, OY
White dwarfs
M-type main-sequence stars
J10062206-7014045